International Decision Systems (IDS)  is a software development company that creates software for financial institutions and equipment-leasing companies.

History
IDS was founded in 1974 as Decision Systems. In 2000, the company changed its name to International Decision Systems when it went public in a merger with the British company CFS. Two years later in 2003, the company was bought back by the managers of IDS for $25 million. In 2008, IDS filed papers for an IPO hoping to raise $86 million.

Company Overview
International Decision Systems, Inc. provides asset finance and portfolio management software for the asset financing industry. IDS headquarters is located in Minneapolis, Minnesota with additional offices in Sydney, Australia; London, United Kingdom; Singapore; and Bangalore, India.

Controversies
A lawsuit was filed against IDS in 2003, shortly after IDS managers bought back the company. Capital Stream Inc. filed a $20 million lawsuit alleging IDS executives used insider knowledge to buy the company.

References

External links
 Company website

Financial services companies of the United States
Financial software companies